John Edgar may refer to:
John Edgar (politician) (1750–1832), Irish-American pioneer and politician
John Edgar (minister) (1798–1866), Presbyterian minister, professor of theology, and moderator of the Presbyterian Church of Ireland
John George Edgar (1834–1864), writer
John Edgar (English footballer) (1930–2006), English football midfielder for Bishop Auckland and Darlington in 1950s
John Edgar (Scottish footballer), Scottish football forward for Arsenal, Aberdeen and others in 1910s
John Ware Edgar (1839–1902), British colonial administrator in British India
Johnny Edgar (1936–2008), English football forward for Hartlepools United, Gillingham, York City, and others in 1950s/1960s
John Edgar (sculptor) - New Zealand artist

See also
Jon Edgar (born 1968), British artist